Christ Church, Toxteth Park, is in Linnet Lane, Liverpool, Merseyside, England.  It is an active Anglican parish church in the deanery of Wavertree and Toxteth, the archdeaconry of Liverpool, and the diocese of Liverpool. Its benefice is united with that of St Michael, Aigburth.  The church is recorded in the National Heritage List for England as a designated Grade II listed building.

History

Christ Church was built in 1867–71, designed by Culshaw and Sumners, and paid for by George Horsfall.  The church cost about £20.000 to build (equivalent to £ in ), and was consecrated by the Rt Revd William Jacobson, bishop of Chester, on 27 April 1871.

Architecture

Exterior
The church is constructed in stone with slate roofs.  Its architectural style is Decorated.  The plan consists of a six-bay nave with a clerestory, north and south aisles, a canted chancel with a three-bay vestry to the south and a two-bay porch to the north, and a north tower with a broach spire. The tower has angle buttresses, three-light louvred bell openings, the middle light on each side having a balcony carried on angel corbels. On the tower is a broach spire, the broaches being bowed.  At the west end is a five-light window containing Geometric tracery.  The windows along the sides of the aisles have three lights and are placed between buttresses.  The windows along the clerestory are lunettes with pointed arches.  The east window has three lights.  The porch has a hipped roof and entrances on the north and east sides.  The vestry also has a hipped roof, and is approached by steps.

Interior
Inside the church the arcades are carried on slender quatrefoil piers that have capitals carved with foliage.  The nave has a hammerbeam roof.  The sanctuary floor and the reredos date from 1930, and were designed by Bernard Miller. The stained glass in the apse appears to be contemporary with the church, and was possibly designed by Hardman.  In the south aisle are two windows dating from the early 20th century by Gustave Hiller; one of which has a depiction of the east end of Liverpool Cathedral.  There are also two windows by Shrigley and Hunt.  The original pipe organ had three manuals and was built by C. and J. Whiteley.  This was superseded by an organ, also with three manuals, by Willis.

Christ Church Today 
At Christ Church we are striving to be a community where everyone is welcomed, valued and included. We subscribe to the Inclusive Church Statement of Belief.

We believe in a church which seeks not to discriminate, on any level, on grounds of economic power, gender, mental health, physical ability, race or sexuality. We believe in Church which welcomes and serves all people in the name of Jesus Christ; which is scripturally faithful; which seeks to proclaim the Gospel afresh for each generation; and which, in the power of the Holy Spirit, allows all people to grasp how wide and long and high and deep is the love of Jesus Christ.”

We meet for worship every Sunday at 10.30am, and informally through the week. Holy Communion is celebrated twice monthly. We are committed to each other's welfare and to that of the local community.

Whether you're 5 or 95, a student or retired, all are welcome to join us at our weekly service, every Sunday morning at 10:30am. We also get together regularly for social and other activities.

See also

Grade II listed buildings in Liverpool-L17

Notes and references
Notes

Citations

Sources

Churches in Liverpool
Grade II listed buildings in Liverpool
Grade II listed churches in Merseyside
Anglican Diocese of Liverpool
Church of England church buildings in Merseyside
Gothic Revival church buildings in England
Gothic Revival architecture in Merseyside
Churches completed in 1871
19th-century Church of England church buildings